Margaret Moffat (Madge) Elder (17 July 1893 - 25 December 1985) was a Scottish gardener, plant nursery owner, writer and feminist. She published two books on the history and folklore of the Scottish Borders, as well as regular articles for the Weekly Scotsman and The Scots Magazine. She recognised similarities between the suffrage movement and pioneering women gardener.

Early life and education 
Madge Elder was born in Portobello, near Edinburgh, on 17 July 1893 to Margaret Virtue and John Elder, a marine engineer. She was brought up on a farm in Berwickshire and educated at Gordon village school. She was solely reliant on lip-reading for communication due to deafness.

At the age of 19, she was one of the first classes to graduate from Scotland's first horticultural college for women: the Edinburgh School of Gardening for Women in Corstorphine, graduating with a first-class certificate in horticulture.

References 

1893 births
1985 deaths
Scottish gardeners
Scottish women writers